Asteroma is a genus of pathogenic fungus in the family  Gnomoniaceae, containing several species that cause leaf spot and canker on plants such as goldenrod, primrose, and Erythronium.

References

Fungal tree pathogens and diseases
Diaporthales